The Thousand Talents Plan or Thousand Talents Program (TTP), or Overseas High-Level Talent Recruitment Programs is a program by the central government of China to recruit experts in science and technology from abroad, principally but not exclusively from overseas Chinese communities.

Evaluations of the programs efficacy and impact have been mixed. Although the program has successfully attracted top international talent to China, its efficacy in retaining these talented individuals has been questioned, with many of the most talented scientists willing to spend short periods in China but unwilling to abandon their tenured positions at major Western universities. A study published in 2023 found that the Young Thousand Talents program has been successful in recruiting high-caliber academic talent whose publication of scientific papers outperforms their peers. Law enforcement and counterintelligence agencies in the United States, Australia, Canada, and other countries have raised concerns about the program as a vector for intellectual property theft and espionage.

Background 

Many Chinese students often go abroad for advanced studies and the vast majority of whom decide to remain abroad after their studies. To reverse this trend and to build the size and prestige of China's university system, the central government of China recognized the need and turned to attracting overseas Chinese and top foreign-born talent from the world's best universities.

The Thousand Talent program is the most prominent of China's more than 200 talent recruitment programs. It grew out of the "Talent Superpower Strategy" of the 17th National Congress of the Chinese Communist Party (CCP) in 2007. The CCP Central Committee and State Council of the People's Republic of China elevated the program in 2010 to become the top-level award given through China's National Talent Development Plan to strengthen innovation and international competitiveness within China. In 2019, the program was re-branded as the "National High-end Foreign Experts Recruitment Plan." The CCP's United Front Work Department's Western Returned Scholars Association is the official representative body for program participants.

China also administers a "Young Thousand Talents" program as a "youth" branch of the Thousand Talents Plan. It focuses on the recruitment of early career STEM scholars.

Previous attempts to attract foreign scientific talent through a decentralized network of approximately 600  "talent recruitment stations" worldwide had been largely ineffective at convincing top researchers to leave developed countries permanently.

Selection 

The Thousand Talents program primarily targets Chinese citizens who were educated in elite programs overseas and who have been successful as entrepreneurs, professionals, and researchers. The program also recognizes a small number of elite foreign-born experts with skills that are critical to China's international competitiveness in science and innovation. International experts in the latter category are typically winners of major prizes such as the Nobel Prize and the Fields Medal, and are expected first to have made internationally renowned contributions to a field of technological importance to China, and secondly to hold either a tenured position at one of the world's top universities or a senior role in an internationally important research organization.

In 2013, the Junior Thousand Talent Plan was created to attract faculty members under the age of 40 who have performed high impact research at one of the world's top universities. Although these professorships can be affiliated with any university in China, they are awarded disproportionately to individuals affiliated with the most prestigious (C9 League) universities; the few individuals who receive both this and the Changjiang (Yangtze River) Scholar award are typically associated with the C9 League.

The program includes two mechanisms: resources for permanent recruitment into Chinese academia, and resources for short-term appointments that typically target international experts who have full-time employment at a leading international university or research laboratory.

Within a decade of the announcement of the Thousand Talents Plan in 2008, it had attracted more than 7,000 people overall. More than 1,400 people participating in the Thousand Talents Plan, including several foreigners, specialize in life sciences fields.

More than 300 scientists and scholars at Australian tertiary institutions are connected to the program, according to research by Australian Strategic Policy Institute.

The Thousand Talents Plan professorship is the highest academic honor awarded by the State Council, analogous to the top-level award given by the Ministry of Education.

Benefits to participants 
The program confers the prestigious title of "Thousand Talents Plan Distinguished Professor" (千人计划特聘教授) or "Junior Thousand Talents Plan Professor" upon the selected individuals, and provides benefits including this prestigious title, high pay, and visa privileges. The program is the first ever to enable individuals of extraordinary ability to gain access to Chinese immigration visas, including "long-stay visas." The program provides a one-time bonus of 1 million RMB to select individuals, substantial resources for research and academic exchange, and assistance with housing and transportation costs. Thousand Talents scholars are eligible for high levels of government funding.

Participants in the Young Thousand Talents program receive a one-time award of 500,000 RMB and start-up grants between 1 million and three million RMB. These packages are typically matched by host institutions in China or local governments. Participants also receive fringe benefits including subsidized housing and prioritization when applying for grants.

Reaction

Conflict of interest and fraud allegations
Some Thousand Talents Plan Professors have reported fraud in the program including misappropriated grant funding, poor accommodations, and violations of research ethics. Dismissals due to undisclosed connections to the TTP have taken place. Individuals who receive either of China's two top academic awards, the Thousand Talents Professorship and the Changjiang (Yangtze River) Scholar award, have become targets for recruitment by China's wealthiest universities so frequently that the Ministry of Education issued notices in both 2013 and 2017 discouraging Chinese universities from recruiting away top talent from one another.

Foreign government reactions

The success of the program in recruiting U.S.-trained scientists back to China has been viewed with concern from the U.S., with a June 2018 report from the National Intelligence Council declaring an underlying motivation of the program to be “to facilitate the legal and illicit transfer of US technology, intellectual property and know-how” to China. US and Canadian authorities have asserted that China intends to use scientists who are involved with this plan to gain access to new technology for economic and military advantage. The Federal Bureau of Investigation (FBI) has indicated that foreign recruitment sponsor talent plans "to bring outside knowledge and innovation back to their countries—and sometimes that means stealing trade secrets, breaking export control laws, or violating conflict-of-interest policies to do so."

In January 2020, the FBI arrested Charles M. Lieber, the chair of Harvard University's Department of Chemistry and Chemical Biology, for lying about his ties to the program, and was convicted in December 2021. In May 2020, the FBI arrested a former researcher at the Cleveland Clinic for failing to disclose ties to the Thousand Talents Program, although a year later federal prosecutors dismissed the case. In June 2020, it was reported that the National Institutes of Health had investigations into the behavior of 189 scientists. In November 2020, Song Guo Zheng, a TTP participant, pled guilty to making false claims to the FBI about his ties to the Chinese government during his employment at Ohio State University.

In November 2019, the US Senate Permanent Subcommittee on Investigations and Committee on Homeland Security and Governmental Affairs held an open hearing on the China's Talent Recruitment Plans, including the TTP, and called the programs a threat to national security. The report  from the hearing cited TTP contracts as violating research values, TTP members willfully failing to disclose their membership to their home institutions, and cited numerous cases against TTP members for theft of intellectual property and fraud.  One TTP member stole proprietary defense information on U.S. military jet engines. The report indicated that "TTP targets U.S.-based researchers and scientists, regardless of ethnicity or citizenship, who focus on or have access to cutting-edge research and technology."

In August 2020, Canadian Security Intelligence Service (CSIS) warned both Canadian universities and Canadian research institutions of the TTP, saying that it recruited researchers and scientists around the world to persuade them to share their research and technology — either willingly or by coercion.

In September 2022, it was reported that TTP programs recruited over 150 scientists who worked on U.S. government-sponsor research at Los Alamos National Laboratory.

Academia 
Although the program has successfully attracted top international talent to China, its efficacy in retaining these talented individuals has been questioned, with many of the most talented scientists willing to spend short periods in China but unwilling to abandon their tenured positions at major Western universities.

According to academic Scott Moore, the Chinese government had been the most assertive government in the world in introducing policies like the Thousand Talents Plan to trigger “a reverse brain drain." Moore stated that while the program posed several challenges for developed democracies such as incentivizing recruited professors to improperly transfer of resources to their concurrent workplace in China, the biggest challenges had less to do with national security than to "increasingly outdated and misguided immigration policies common among developed democracies." According to Moore, the high number of participants in the program with a specialization in the life sciences prompted US policymakers to view the TTP as signaling by Beijing of its intention to “mount a full-spectrum challenge to US leadership in the biotechnology sector”, with one US policymaker saying the TPP helped build China's talent pipeline for the sector.

Academics Dongbo Shi, Weichen Liu, and Yanbo Wang conducted an analysis of Young Thousand Talent program participants, and concluded "that China’s YTT program has been successful in recruiting and nurturing high-caliber scientists and that YTT scientists outperform their overseas peers in post-return publication, mainly owing to their access to greater funding and larger research teams. These results show the potential of talent programs as a policy tool for countries to attract expatriate scientists and promote their productivity."

References

External links 

 Chinese Talent Program Tracker at the Center for Security and Emerging Technology

Higher education in China
Recruitment
Brain drain
Academic awards in China
2008 establishments in China
Technology transfer